Jab Yaad Kisi Ki Aati Hai  is a 1967 Bollywood film starring Dharmendra and Mala Sinha in a double role, Abhi Bhattacharya and M. Rajan. It is a love story with a little suspense. The title song "Jab Yaad Kisi Ki Aati Hai" is nicely composed.

Cast
Dharmendra
Mala Sinha
Abhi Bhattacharya
M. Rajan

Soundtrack
Music by Madan Mohan and lyrics by Raja Mehdi Ali Khan.

"Tere Bin Saawan Kaise Bita" – Lata Mangeshkar
"Dhoondhe Tujhko Nain Deewaane" – Mahendra Kapoor, Lata Mangeshkar
"Jab Yaad Kisi Ki Aati Hai" – Lata Mangeshkar, Mahendra Kapoor
"Ari O Shok Kaliyo" – Mahendra Kapoor
"Ishq Daulat Se Kharida Nahi Jaataa Pyare" – Mahendra Kapoor
"Kyu Mere Dil Ko Karaar" – Mahendra Kapoor, Lata Mangeshkar
"Piya Se Milan Hoyi Gaya Re" – Lata Mangeshkar

External links 
 

1967 films
1960s Hindi-language films
Films scored by Madan Mohan